Adverse effects by frequency:

Note that teratogenicity is not discussed here as it is not considered a side effect.  For information regarding birth defects, see thalidomide.

Very common (may affect more than 1 in 10 people)

 Somnolence (drowsiness; ~40%)
 Edema (~60%)
 Hypotension (low blood pressure)
 Headache
 Haematuria (blood in the urine)
 Arthralgia (joint pain)
 Myalgia (muscle aches)
 Increased bilirubin
 Neutropenia (~30%)
 Leucopenia (~15-40%)
 Lymphopenia
 Constipation
 Peripheral neuropathy†
 Dizziness
 Paraesthesia
 Dysaesthesia

Common (may affect up to 1 in 10 people)

 Pulmonary embolism
 Vomiting
 Dry mouth
 Toxic skin eruption
 Dry skin
 Rash
 Urticaria (hives)
 Pyrexia (fever)
 Asthenia
 Interstitial lung disease
 Heart failure
 Depression
 Pneumonia

Uncommon (may affect up to 1 in 100 people)
 Shortness of breath
 Tremor

Rare (may affect up to 1 in 1,000 people)

 Increased appetite
 Bradycardia (low heart rate)
 Tachycardia (high heart rate)
 Cardiac arrhythmia
 Malaise
 Deep vein thrombosis

Very rare (may affect up to 1 in 10,000 people)

 Thrombocytopenia
 Anaemia
 Hypothyroidism
 Reduced libido
 Confusion
 Seizures
 Orthostatic hypotension
 Thromboembolic events
 Bronchospasm
 Intestinal obstruction
 Pruritus (itchiness)
 Stevens–Johnson syndrome
 Toxic epidermal necrolysis
 Facial oedema
 Photosensitivity (light sensitivity)
 Menstruation abnormalities

† Peripheral neuropathy may be irreversible and usually results from chronic (usually a matter of months) exposure to thalidomide.

References

Medical controversies
Medication side effects